Proarctacarus johnstoni is a species of mite in the family Arctacaridae.

References

Mesostigmata
Articles created by Qbugbot